The Brightwells Mill Complex historic 19th-century mill complex at 684 Brightwells Mill Road in Madison Heights, Amherst County, Virginia.  It includes a reconstructed 1826 wood-frame mill, dam, miller's house, a number of outbuildings, and a small cemetery.  The dam and mill both date to 1942, when a flash flood destroyed 19th-century structures.  The mill was rebuilt using materials salvaged from the 1826 mill, while the dam was rebuilt in concrete.  The mill was used to process the grain of local farmers until 1965.

The complex was added to the National Register of Historic Places in 2016.

See also
National Register of Historic Places listings in Amherst County, Virginia

References

External links 

Grinding mills on the National Register of Historic Places in Virginia
Historic districts on the National Register of Historic Places in Virginia
Buildings and structures in Amherst County, Virginia
National Register of Historic Places in Amherst County, Virginia
Industrial buildings completed in 1826
Grinding mills in Virginia